Ražnjići is a popular Balkan specialty of grilled meat on a skewer, equivalent of the Greek souvlaki and Turkish şaşlık. The name is derived from ražanj meaning "skewer".

References

Sources

Meat dishes
Street food
Grilled skewers
Balkan cuisine
Serbian cuisine